Couepia bracteosa, also known by the common name pajurá, is a tree found in the Amazon.

Its fruits are used as a food source in rural South America, especially in Brazil.

Commons names include Aruadan, Coro, Marirana, Oiti, Olosapo, Pajura de mata, Pajura-de-racha, and Pajura-verdadeiro.

See also
List of Brazilian fruits

References

External links
Purdue Horticulture

Chrysobalanaceae
Trees of the Amazon
Trees of Brazil
Fruits originating in South America